Lauren "Laddie" Gale (April 22, 1917 – July 29, 1996) was an American collegiate and professional basketball player.

NCAA championship
A native of Oakridge, Oregon, the 6'4" Gale played forward for the University of Oregon under head coach Howard Hobson. He was the second-tallest player (behind 6'8" Urgel "Slim" Wintermute) on the team, which was dubbed "The Tall Firs."

Gale led the Ducks in scoring in 1938 and 1939, earning All-Pacific Coast Conference honors in each season. In 1939, Gale led the Ducks to a national championship in the first-ever Division I men's basketball tournament.

Professional career and later years
After graduation, Gale played professionally in 1939 and 1940 for the Detroit Eagles of the National Basketball League. He left the Eagles in to serve in World War II, reportedly after being the first Oregon draftee selected by lottery. After the war, he played on several semi-pro teams and retired from basketball in 1949.

He died in Gold Beach, Oregon on July 29, 1996.

Halls of Fame
For his stellar collegiate play, for being the first college player regularly to employ a one-handed shot, and for helping to popularize the sport of basketball in the American West, Gale was inducted into the Naismith Memorial Basketball Hall of Fame in 1977 and was an inaugural inductee of the Oregon Sports Hall of Fame in 1980. He is also a member of the University of Oregon Hall of Fame.

References

External links
 

1917 births
1996 deaths
All-American college men's basketball players
Basketball players from Oregon
American men's basketball players
Detroit Eagles players
Forwards (basketball)
Naismith Memorial Basketball Hall of Fame inductees
Oregon Ducks men's basketball players
People from Oakridge, Oregon
American military personnel of World War II